Rubens Valeriano Donizete (born August 14, 1979 in Monte Santo de Minas) is a Brazilian bicyclist who competed in the 2008 Summer Olympics and the 2012 Summer Olympics. He was a member of the Brazilian Mountain Bike team. He currently runs the team AOO/Specialized (2015-2016).

Career 

Rubens worked as a bricklayer in his hometown. In 2000, he had to make a difficult decision and that would forever change his life, he stopped his paid work and devoted himself exclusively to cycling. In 2001 he got his first sponsorship. At that point he had the vision to represent Brazil in the Olympics. After many wins in competitions inside out outside of Brazil, his Olympic dream began in 2007. He joined the national mountain bike team that competed in the Pan American Games in Rio de Janeiro, and took the silver medal.

Rubens won the 2008 Brazilian mountain biking championship and the vacancy for the 2008 Beijing Olympic Games where he finished as the best Brazilian in 21st position.

In 2015 he was hired by Team AOO/Specialized, looking to the vacancy for the Olympic games in Rio de Janeiro 2016.

Major achievements

2014 
 November 23, 2014 - CHAMPION - Regional Open Games - Bauru - SP - Brazil
 November 17, 2014 - 3rd Place - 2º Circuit Imbatível de MTB Pague Menos by Ravelli - Nova Odessa - SP - Brazil
 October 19, 2014 - CHAMPION - Avibe CUP MTB 2014 - Ubá - MG - Brazil
 October 12, 2014 - CHAMPION - 4th stage International MTB Cup - XCO - São Roque - SP - Brazil 
September 14, 2014 - Practice Test - 6th Step XCM - Copa kalangasbikes - São João da Boa Vista - SP - Brazil
September 6, 2014 - 79th Place -   2014 UCI Mountain Bike & Trials World Championships - Hafjell - Norway
August 17, 2014 - 18th Place - 3rd stage International MTB Cup - XCM - Barbacena - MG - Brazil
August 10, 2014 - 78th Place - 6th Stage World Cup MTB XCO 2014 - Windham - United States
August 3, 2014 - 90th Place - 5th Stage World Cup MTB XCO 2014 - Mont-Sainte-Anne - Canada
July 20, 2014 - 5th Place - Brazilian Cup MTB XCO - Cotia - SP - Brazil
July 8, 2014 - 2nd Place - Elite Mode Cycling MTB - 58th Regional Games of the 2nd Region Sports - Caraguatatuba - SP - Brazil
July 6, 2014 - CHAMPION - 2nd Step - Brazil Cup MTB - UCI Class 2 XCO - Rio das Ostras - RJ - Brasil
June 1, 2014 - CHAMPION - VIII Cup MTB Fest 2014 - Passos - MG - Brazil
May 25, 2014 - 3rd Place - 70 km Mountain Bike - Brasília - DF - Brazil
May 18, 2014 - 2nd Place - 2nd stage International Cup MTB - XCO - São João Del Rei - MG - Brazil
May 17, 2014 - 4th Place - Sprint Eliminator XCE - 2nd stage International Cup MTB - XCO - São João Del Rei - MG - Brazil
April 27, 2014 - CHAMPION - Mantiqueira Challenge MTB - Campos do Jordão - SP - Brazil
March 30, 2014 - 15th Place - Pan American Championship MTB 2014 XCO - Barbacena -MG - Brazil
March 23, 2014 - 3rd place - Overall 1ª stage Internacional Cup MTB - XCO - Araxá - MG - Brazil
March 23, 2014 - 5th place - 3º phase XCS 1ª stage Internacional Cup MTB - XCO - Araxá - MG - Brazil
March 22, 2014 - 3rd place - 2º phase XCS 1ª stage Internacional Cup MTB - Short Track XCC - Araxá - MG - Brazil
March 21, 2014 - 2nd place - 1º phase XCS 1ª stage Internacional Cup MTB - Contra-relógio XCT - Araxá/MG - Brasil
March 15, 2014 - 2nd place - Sul-americanos Games - Santiago - Chile
March 9, 2014 - 2nd place - 1º stage - Trophy Brazil MTB XCO - Campo Largo – PR  - Brazil
February 8, 2014 - 2nd place - Cup Internacional Chile UCI Classe 2 XCO - Chile

2013 
December 15, 2013 - 2nd place - 1º Circuit Imbatível de MTB Pague Menos by Ravelli - Nova Odessa - SP - Brazil
December 7, 2013 - 4th place - RED BULL Amazônia KIRIMBAWA - Manaus - AM - Brazil
November 24, 2013 - 5th place - National Brazilian Championship XCM - Juiz de Fora - MG Brazil
November 2, 2013 – 6th place – Circuito Latino Americano MTB Shimano Short Track – Medellin - Colômbia
October 20, 2013 – Champion - 77th Edition Game Open inside State São Paulo cat. MTB - Mogi das Cruzes - SP - Brazil
October 6, 2013 – 2nd place - current MTB International Cup 2013 – Costa do Sauípe – BA - Brazil
October 6, 2013 – 6th place - Maraton XCM - 5th stage - MTB International Cup – Costa do Sauípe – BA - Brazil
October 5, 2013 – Champion - Short Track XCC - 5th stage - MTB International Cup – Costa do Sauípe – BA - Brazil
October 4, 2013 – 3rd place - Time trial XCT - 5th stage - MTB International Cup – Costa do Sauípe – BA - Brazil
September 8, 2013 - Champion - Shimano Fest Short Track - Mogi das Cruzes - SP - Brazil
September 1, 2013 - 41st place - 2013 UCI Mountain Bike & Trials World Championships - Pietermaritzburg - South Africa
August 18, 2013 – 6th place – 4th stage - XCM MTB International Cup – Congonhas – MG  - Brazil
August 16, 2013 – Champion - challenge ascent uphill - 4th stage - MTB International Cup – Congonhas – MG - Brazil
August 10, 2013 - 36th place - 2013 UCI Mountain Bike World Cup - Mont Sainte Anne - Canada
July 21, 2013 - 3rd place - National Brazilian Championship XCO - Juiz de Fora - MG - Brazil
June 30, 2013 - 2nd place - 3rd stage - XCO MTB International Cup – Divinópolis – MG - Brazil
June 28, 2013 – 4th place – 3rd stage - Sprint Eliminator - MTB International Cup – Divinópolis – MG - Brazil
June 9, 2013 – Champion  - 2nd stage - Brazil Cup MTB XCO – Campo Largo – PR  - Brazil
May 19, 2013 – Champion - Trophy Brazil XCO – Rios das Ostras – RJ  - Brasil
May 5, 2013 – 2nd place – 2nd stage - XCO MTB International Cup – São João Del Rei – MG - Brazil
April 7, 2013 - 4th place - 2013 MTB Pan American Games - Tafi Del Valle – Tucuman - Argentina
March 24, 2013 – Champion – 1st stage - XCO MTB International Cup – Araxá – MG - Brazil
March 23, 2013 – 5th place – 1st stage - Sprint Eliminator - MTB International Cup – Araxá – MG - Brazil
March 10, 2013 – 4th place - 1st stage - Brazil Cup MTB XCO – Campo Largo – PR  - Brazil
February 3, 2013 – 2nd place – 1st stage - XCO Circuit Caloi Gp Ravelli – Itú – SP - Brazil

2012 
November 19, 2012 - Champion – Regional Open Games – Bauru – SP - Brazil
September 30, 2012 - Champion – 3rd stage - MTB Brazil Cup – Campo Largo – PR - Brazil
September 8, 2012 - 47th Place - 2012 UCI Mountain Bike & Trials World Championships- Saalfelden - Austria
August 26, 2012 – 2nd Place – Shimano Short Track – Mogi das Cruzes – SP - Brazil
August 19, 2012 - Five-time Champion – MTB International Cup – Congonhas – MG - Brazil
August 19, 2012 – 4th Place – 4th stage - MTB International Cup – Congonhas – MG - Brazil
 August 12, 2012 – 24th Place – Olympic Games of London – London - England
 July 15, 2012 - three-time Champion - National Brazilian Championship XCO - Salvador - BA - Brazil
June 24, 2012 - Champion – 3rd stage - MTB International Cup UCI – Divinópolis – MG - Brazil
May 20, 2012 - 2nd Place – 2nd stage - MTB Brazil Cup – Rio das Ostras – RJ - Brazil
May 6, 2012 - 2nd Place – 2nd stage - MTB International Cup UCI – São Lourenço – MG - Brazil
April 22, 2012 - 2nd Place - Portugal Cup XCO Marietel - Seia - Portugal
April 8, 2012 - Bronze Medal - 2012 Mountain Bike Pan American Games - Puebla - México
March 25, 2012 - 2nd Place – 1st stage - MTB International Cup - Araxá – MG - Brazil
March 17, 2012 - 4th Place - Quaker-Cannondale XCO Cup - Nevados de Chillán - Chile
March 11, 2012 - Champion – 1st stage - MTB Brazil Cup – Campo Largo – PR - Brazil
February 26, 2012 – Champion – National Cup - Orosí - Paraíso de Cartago – Costa Rica
February 12, 2012 – Champion – 1st stage - GP Ravelli – Itú – SP - Brazil

2011 
October 16, 2011 - 5th Place - 2011 Pan American Games - Guadalajara - Mexico
September 3, 2011 - 48th Place - 2011 UCI Mountain Bike & Trials World Championships- Champery - Switzerland
August 21, 2011 - four-time Champion - MTB International Cup - Congonhas - MG - Brazil
August 21, 2011 - 2nd Place - 3rd stage - MTB International Cup - Congonhas - MG - Brazil
August 7, 2011 - Champion - MTB Championship interstate - Vinhedo- SP - Brazil
July 31, 2011 - 10th Place - Hadleigh Farm Mountain Bike International - London - England
 July 17, 2011 - Two-time Champion National Brazilian Championship XCO - Caconde - SP - Brazil
July 3, 2011 - 3rd Place - 1st stage - MTB Santa Catarina Cup - Balneário Camboriú - SC - Brazil
July 19, 2011 - 5th Place - 2nd stage - MTB International Cup - São Lourenço - MG - Brazil
May 29, 2011 - Champion - 2nd stage - MTB Championship interstate - Vinhedo- SP - Brazil
May 22, 2011 - 2nd Place - 2nd stage - Taça Brasil de Mountain Bike – Rio de Janeiro - RJ - Brazil
April 17, 2011 - 2nd Place - 1st stage - MTB International Cup - Araxá - MG - Brazil
April 3, 2011 - 12th Place - 2011 Mountain Bike Pan American Games - Chia - Colombia
March 20, 2011 - Champion - 1st stage - MTB Championship interstate - Jarinu - SP - Brazil
March 13, 2011 - 2nd Place – 1st stage - MTB Brazil Cup – Campo Largo – PR - Brazil
February 13, 2011 – 2nd Place – 1st stage - GP Ravelli – ITU – SP - Brazil

2010 
Champion Xterra Regional Estrada Real - Tiradentes - MG - Brazil
Champion SHIMANO SHORT TRACK - Colombia
Three-time Champion MTB International Levorin Cup - Congonhas - Brazil
Three-time Champion SR Suntour Short Track - São Silvano 2010 - Brazil
Runner-up Brazilian - 2010 -Brazil
Silver Medal 2010 Mountain Bike Pan American Games - Guatemala
Silver Medal 2010 South American Games - Colombia
Champion SRAM 50K - Brazil
Champion 1st stage - MTB International Levorin Cup - Araxá - Brazil
Champion 2nd stage - MTB International Levorin Cup - São Lourenço - Brazil
Champion 1st stage - GP Ravelli - Brazil
8th place Tour de La Villa D´Aosta - Italy

2009 
Champion MTB 12 Horas - Brazil
Champion 70 km of Ceilândia - Brazil
Two-time Champion MTB International Vzan Cup - Brazil
Champion 2nd stage - MTB International Cup - São Lourenço - MG - Brazil
Two-time Champion Shimano Short Track São Silvano - Brazil
Champion ALE Inconfidentes Cup - Brazil
Best Brazilian UCI Mountain Bike World Cup 31st position - Mont-Sainte-Anne - Canada
Champion 1st stage - GP Ravelli - Brazil
Champion 2nd stage - GP Ravelli - Brazil
Two-time Champion - GP Ravelli - Brazil
Champion 1st stage - X-Terra – Estrada Real - Brazil
Champion 1st stage - Inconfidentes Cup - Brazil

2008 
Champion Moda Cup - Brazil
Champion GP Ravelli - Brazil
Champion Shimano Short-Track São Silvano - Brazil
Champion da MTB Internacional Cup - Brazil
Vice-Campeão Brasieliro Cross Country - Brazil
 21st place - Best Brazilian Beijing Olympics - China
Best Brazilian UCI Mountain Bike World Cup 25th place

2007 
 Champion Brasileiro de MTB
Silver medal 2007 Pan American Games mountain bike - Rio de Janeiro - Brazil
Champion MTB Assitur Cup - Brazil

References

External links
 Official London 2012 website
 Portal da Confederação Brasileira Mountain Bike
 Portal da Confederação Brasileira de Ciclismo
 Union Cycliste Internationale

1979 births
Living people
Brazilian male cyclists
Brazilian mountain bikers
Cross-country mountain bikers
Cyclists at the 2007 Pan American Games
Cyclists at the 2008 Summer Olympics
Cyclists at the 2012 Summer Olympics
Cyclists at the 2016 Summer Olympics
Olympic cyclists of Brazil
Sportspeople from Minas Gerais
Pan American Games silver medalists for Brazil
Pan American Games medalists in cycling
Cyclists at the 2015 Pan American Games
South American Games silver medalists for Brazil
South American Games medalists in cycling
Competitors at the 2010 South American Games
Competitors at the 2014 South American Games
Medalists at the 2007 Pan American Games
20th-century Brazilian people
21st-century Brazilian people